Muhammad Khairu Azrin bin Khazali (born 13 July 1991) is a Malaysian footballer who plays for Malaysia Super League club Kelantan United in Malaysia Super League. Khairu Azrin mainly plays as a defensive midfielder but can also play as an attacking midfielder and central midfielder.

Club career

Melaka United
In November 2016, Khairu Azrin signed with 2016 Premier League champions, Melaka United. On 27 January 2017, he made his debut and scored one goal for his team during first league match against Selangor in Selayang Stadium. That match end up with a draw 1–1.

PKNS
In June 2017, during second window transfer, Khairu Azrin returned to PKNS after just 6 months playing for Melaka United. It has been agreed that S. Sivanesan will replaced him at Melaka United in a win-win situation deals.

Felda United 
Khairu Azrin joined Felda United F.C. in 2018 for the 2018 Malaysia Premier League and the team won the league.

Terengganu FC 
In the 2019 season, Khairu Azrin joined Terengganu alongside Syamim Yahya from Felda United.

Kedah Darul Aman 
On 1 December 2021, Khairu Azrin agreed to join Malaysia Super League side Kedah Darul Aman FC.

Career statistics

Club

Honours
Penang FA
 Malaysia Premier League :2020

References

External links

1991 births
Living people
Malaysian footballers
Malaysia Super League players
PKNS F.C. players
Felda United F.C. players
Association football midfielders
Melaka United F.C. players
Terengganu FC players
Penang F.C. players
Kelantan United F.C. players
Malaysian people of Malay descent